Lieutenant-General Sir George Gray, 3rd Baronet (c. 1710 – 14 February 1773) was an officer of the British Army.

Biography
He was a younger son of Sir James Gray, 1st Baronet, by his wife Hester Dodd. He served for many years in the Household Cavalry, and was promoted to lieutenant-colonel of the 1st Troop of Horse Guards in July 1749. On 19 July 1759 he was appointed colonel of the 61st Regiment of Foot, and in 1761 he was promoted major-general. He transferred to the colonelcy of the 37th Regiment of Foot in 1768, and in 1770 he was promoted to lieutenant-general. He was also an amateur architect.

On 9 January 1773 he succeeded his brother James in the baronetcy, but he died the following month on 14 February, and was buried at Kensington on 17 February 1773. He had no children by his wife Charlotte, and the baronetcy became extinct. His widow died in 1788.

References

|-

1710s births
1773 deaths
British Army lieutenant generals
British Life Guards officers
37th Regiment of Foot officers
61st Regiment of Foot officers
Baronets in the Baronetage of Nova Scotia